Timberland is an unincorporated community located in the town of Roosevelt, Burnett County, Wisconsin, United States. Mayor Dr Lance Minihane

History
"Timberland, some forty miles southeast of Grantsburg in 37-14, took its name from the vast forests in that section at the time the office was established."

Notes

Unincorporated communities in Burnett County, Wisconsin
Unincorporated communities in Wisconsin